Dred Wimberly (1848 - June 16, 1937) was a state legislator in North Carolina. He served in the North Carolina House of Representatives in 1879 and 1887 and in the North Carolina Senate in 1889. He represented Edgecombe County. He was a Republican. He married twice and had several children.

When he was a slave he was owned by the Battle family. A historical marker in Rocky Mount, North Carolina commemorates his achievements.

He is buried at Unity Cemetery in Rocky Mount.

See also
African-American officeholders during and following the Reconstruction era
List of first African-American U.S. state legislators

References

1848 births
1937 deaths
Republican Party members of the North Carolina House of Representatives
Republican Party North Carolina state senators
19th-century American slaves
American freedmen